Ncaang is a village in Kgalagadi District of Botswana. It is located in the northern part of the district, in Kalahari Desert. The population was 228 in 2011 census.

References

Kgalagadi District
Villages in Botswana